The General is a 1936 novel authored by writer C. S. Forester. Known for his Horatio Hornblower novels and 1935's The African Queen, Forester attempted in the work to portray the then recently finished conflict of World War I in a decidedly realistic though still narrative-based and compelling fashion. The book centres on the titular general and portrays, among other things, the British Army's efforts to deal with the dilemma of trench warfare.

In terms of plot, The General follows the career of a professional soldier, Herbert Curzon, from his service as a junior officer in the Second Boer War through his experiences as a senior commander in the aforementioned First World War. While personally courageous and dedicated, Curzon is otherwise unexceptional: he serves as an officer like many others. The stalemate of the conflict irritates him as he receives greater and greater promotion yet finds himself ordering great numbers of regular soldiers to their deaths. Though surviving when many do not and displaying an honorable sense of individual character, Curzon finally determines his willingness to sacrifice his life during the fateful offensive of the Central Powers enacted in 1918. While without truly great fault, it is Curzon's lack of true psychological foresight and unimaginative nature that appears to define him given the inanity of the war.

Reviewers have lauded the work over multiple decades. Commentators have particular cited the ordinariness of Forester's character, which as a story element serves to give the novel power. Examples of more recent praise includes the writings of historian Max Hastings.

Plot

Overall story framework
At the beginning of the Great War, upon mobilisation in August 1914, Curzon holds the rank of senior major in the not particularly fashionable 22nd Lancers. During the Boer War he won some distinction in an old-style cavalry charge but his character-forming career since has been a matter of rigid and unimaginative peacetime routine.

Curzon is given a temporary promotion to battalion command and then quickly a brigade command.  At the Battle of Ypres, he manages to keep his head about him and following the death of his brigadier becomes a general.  He returns to England, while his unit is in Belgium and is promoted again though chance and political intrigue. He makes an advantageous marriage to Emily the daughter of the Duke of Bude which gives him political connections to the opposition "Bude House" set.

Curzon is promoted again and again, eventually being placed in command of the 10,000-man (fictional) 91st Infantry Division, ordering attacks that condemn many of them to mutilation and death amongst the shells, gas and the machine guns. At the end, the 91st Division, which he has brought to a high degree of efficiency, is forced to retreat in the March 1918 German offensive. Faithful to his own traditional values, Curzon decides to "go up the line" among his troops on his horse with a sword rather than face defeat and professional failure. The novel implies that he seeks death in battle; he says "We can still go down fighting". He is injured by a shell fragment, endures months of drugged agony and loses a leg. His war is over.

Psyche of the main character

Curzon – General Sir Herbert Curzon by this time – is not a brutal man or an uncaring one: simply a brave and honest but stubborn and unimaginative leader. For Forester, the tale of Herbert Curzon's almost inevitable rise to high command, the senseless slaughters he directs and his eventual retirement to the life of an aged cripple in a wheelchair, is not about Curzon – it is about the attitudes and mores of the British Army and of British ruling society more generally: the limited and inflexible mindsets that (in Forester's view) contributed to the appalling casualties and the horrors of the First World War.

He distrusts theorists, and is not part of the "blood-brotherhood of Camberley" (the staff college) Like his seniors he believes in "Attrition" and the "Big Push" with brute force; more men, more guns. Hence he is startled by the tank victory at Cambrai.

War Office scene

The novel has an episode in the War Office with a field-marshal, a general and a major-general agreeing to promote Curzon, which is not due to any scheming but because though there were a hundred possible officers "an adventitious circumstance had singled him out for particular notice". Major-General Mackenzie laments, "where am I to get three hundred good brigadiers from?". The field-marshal (who is constructing a "modern army" out of the remains of the Expeditionary Force that Curzon was in) has Curzon promoted to major-general so he outranks Webb, as Curzon is junior to Webb as brigadier-general. But later Curzon has to "unstick" (send home) Webb when he wants to "adjust" (withdraw) his line. Eventually Curzon has command of four divisions or a hundred thousand men: "as many as Wellington or Marlborough ever commanded."

At the outbreak of war, "someone in London had done his work extraordinarily well to "put an Army” (the British Expeditionary Force) ashore lacking absolutely nothing. Curzon is promoted to (temporary) lieutenant-colonel as a "vigorous younger man" to replace his predecessor, who is near retirement and is given an (unwelcome) promotion to train a brigade of yeomanry. But with the Ninety-first division, one of the new armies, "the War Office was found wanting … they were left unclothed, unhoused and unarmed (and) shivered in tents pitched in seas of mud"  So Curzon got Mackenzie to wangle allocations of duckboards etc to make life bearable by saying he was dining with influential people (he was dining with Emily).

Mackenzie is the Director-General of Tactical Services, and when the Liberal Government admitted some of the Opposition to government: "while men in high position fell right and left, General Mackenzie remained Director-General of Tactical Services. Others greater than he – among them the greatest Minister of War that England ever had – were flung out of office, but Mackenzie remained despite his very unsound attitude in the Ulster crisis. Perhaps that is the most important contribution Curzon ever made to the history of England" Curzon, one of whose traits is personal loyalty, has urged his father-in-law the Duke to keep Mackenzie.

The field marshal and Minister of War was Sirdar of the Egyptian Army when he was forty-one (Curzon's age), so is similar to Kitchener. But in the novel he is forced from office, not drowned at sea. He is replaced by another cavalry-man, Scottish instead of Irish, named as Haig.

Reception and effect of the novel

The General has been widely praised as being an excellent and very realistic account of the mindset of the British Officer Corps in times of war and as such many veterans are surprised to learn that the author himself never actually served in the armed forces.  In fact, a persistent yet unsubstantiated rumor states that Adolf Hitler was so impressed with the novel that he made it required reading for his top field commanders and general staff, in the hopes that it would allow prominent German officers to be able to understand how their British counterparts thought. This rumor is referred to as fact by Forester in a foreword to a later edition of the novel.

Historian Max Hastings, in his book Catastrophe 1914: Europe Goes to War, calls The General "brilliantly contemptuous", and writes that "[Forester] likened the commanders of World War I to savages, striving to extract a screw from a piece of timber by main force, assisted by ever more fulcrums and levers" failing to grasp that simply twisting the screw would remove it "with a fraction of the effort."  Hastings remarks: This view of wartime generalship, which was essentially also that of Churchill and Lloyd George, has commanded widespread favour ever since. But what if, as most scholars of the conflict today believe, it was impossible to 'turn the screw', to identify any credible means for breaking the stalemate?

See also

Historical fiction
World War I in popular culture

References

External links
 

1936 British novels
Novels set during World War I
Novels by C. S. Forester
Michael Joseph books
Little, Brown and Company books